The New Orthodox Synagogue, Košice was built in the years 1926–1927 at Puškinova Street near the historic centre of Košice, Slovakia. It superseded the older Orthodox Synagogue in Zvonárska Street, constructed in 1899 to the design of János Balogh.

The building
The synagogue was designed by the Budapest-educated architect . The facade uses both neo-classical and local traditional motifs; and example of the latter is the attic storey in a style often found in renaissance buildings of Eastern Slovakia. The interior, largely constructed in concrete, is in the modernist with a domed central hall and a women's gallery with a metal mechitzah. The central bimah faces a Torah ark made of red marble. A school was built adjoining the synagogue and a mikveh (ritual bath) was planned but not constructed.

Holocaust memorial plate
Transports of Jews from Kosice to Nazi camps were carried out during World War II. A bronze Holocaust memorial plate was installed on the front of the synagogue in 1992. It informs that more than 12,000 Jews of Košice were taken to concentration camps in 1944. It does not mention that more than 2,000 Jews from Košice's surroundings were concentrated here and then also sent to the concentration camps. Only 400 of all transported Jews survived.

See also
 History of the Jews in Slovakia

Gallery

References
Notes

Sources
Borský, Maroš (2007).Synagogue Architecture in Slovakia: A Memorial Landscape of a Lost Community. Bratislava: Jewish Heritage foundation. .

External links

 
Synagogues of Kosice, Synagoga Slovaca.
Ethel Flam (nee Frankfurter) Kosice survivor testimony – video, telling of the roundup in the synagogue yard.

Synagogues in Slovakia
Buildings and structures in Košice
Kosice
Synagogues completed in 1927
1927 establishments in Slovakia
20th-century architecture in Slovakia